Mikhail Ivanovich Kanashev (4 September 1866, Orenburg Governorate — after 1917) was a wachtmeister of the Imperial Russian Army, a head of a village (stanytsia otaman) and a deputy of the Fourth Imperial Duma from the Orenburg Governorate between 1912 and 1917. He adjoined the Progressive Party, but than became an independent deputy. December 3, 1913 he was a member of a group of 39 parliamentarians who signed the Duma legislative proposal "On the establishment of a special spiritual administration (muftiate) for the Muslims of the North Caucasus."

Literature 
 Николаев А. Б. Канашев Михаил Иванович (in Russian) // Государственная дума Российской империи: 1906—1917 / Б. Ю. Иванов, А. А. Комзолова, И. С. Ряховская. — Москва: РОССПЭН, 2008. — P. 231. — 735 p. — .
 Канашев (in Russian) // Члены Государственной думы (портреты и биографии): Четвертый созыв, 1912—1917 г. / сост. М. М. Боиович. — Москва: Тип. Т-ва И. Д. Сытина, 1913. — P. 209. — LXIV, 454, [2] p. 
 Законодательное предположение об учреждении особого духовного управления (муфтиата) для мусульман Северного Кавказа // Ab Imperio. — 2011. — No. 4. — P. 279–284. — DOI:10.1353/imp.2011.0005. (in Russian)

1866 births
Date of death missing
People from Chelyabinsk Oblast
People from Chelyabinsky Uyezd
Progressive Party (Russia) politicians
Members of the 4th State Duma of the Russian Empire
Atamans